Cyanocitta is a genus of birds in the family Corvidae, a family which contains the crows, jays and magpies. Established by Hugh Edwin Strickland in 1845, it contains the following species:

The name Cyanocitta is a combination of the Greek words kuanos, meaning "dark blue", and kitta, meaning "jay".

References

External links
 
 

 
Bird genera
Taxa named by Hugh Edwin Strickland